Series 23 of British television drama The Bill was broadcast from 3 January until 28 December 2007. The series consisted of 92 episodes, and saw the conclusion of two long running-storylines, the disappearance of schoolgirl Amy Tennant and DC Zain Nadir’s undercover drug sting, prior to the return of single-themed episodes, removing much of the serialiased format formally introduced in 2002 under producer Paul Marquess; episode titles also started appearing on screen again from Episode 20 onwards. Several episodes were aired out of production order, most notably the final parts of the six episodes for the Zain storyline. Despite at the time not even being billed for broadcast, and the 'previously' and 'next time' segments not matching the episodes around them, the episodes were brought forward due to heavy demand from the British viewing public. This also meant that the 'previously' and 'next time' segments on the subsequent episodes had to be re-edited to show this, and that two small additional scenes had to be recorded to be placed into Episode 480 to reference the death of PC Honey Harman. For the DVD release, to avoid confusion, these episodes have been re-numbered and now serve as 480 and 481, with the following four episodes re-numbered to 482–485 respectively.

This series saw the return of several multi-part story arcs, the likes of which had last featured in the second half of Series 17. Again, several new characters were introduced into the show, including several semi-regular characters, such as non-operational police staff and crime scene examiners. The series also saw the departure of the show's longest-running cast member to date, with Trudie Goodwin leaving the role of June Ackland, and her final episode was originally broadcast on 8 March 2007. Her exit scenes coincided with three guest appearances by former series regular Jim Carver, who made a brief return two years after his original exit, having been the co-protagonist with Goodwin in the series pilot in 1983. This was also the last episode not to feature an on-screen title. A new title sequence was also introduced at the beginning of the series and the theme tune was slightly re-arranged, though the previous version returned a handful of times during the series.

Several major storylines included the aforementioned June Ackland bringing down DAC Georgia Hobbs in a major corruption scandal, and PC Lewis Hardy infiltrating a major street gang that had a hold over his cousin Dominic as part of Aml Ameen's exit storyline. Superintendent John Heaton, introduced in the previous season, took centre stage in two major storylines; the first saw him clash with Ray Moore, a villain from his past portrayed by Mark Bonnar. Later in the series he was the target of a rampaging gunman who killed two men and shot another. An episode in the series also highlighted Honour killing, with the episode it was featured in, To Honour and Obey, being broadcast out of order after its mastertape was stolen along with the one for the previous episode, Blood Money; the episodes were due to air in December 2006. 

On 2 April 2014, the complete series was released on DVD in Australia as a Region 0, playable anywhere in the world. The DVD release carries in the episodes in broadcast order, rather than production order; meaning that the DVD synopsis printed on the sleeve is heavily incorrect. The DVD synopsis also removes all titles (including those carried on screen), and continues to tally the episodes by number. The DVD release does not contain episodes 540–542, "Moving Target" Parts 1–3, due to licensing rights for these episodes not being available.

Cast changes

Arrivals
 PC Beth Green (Baby Trade-)
 DC Grace Dasari (Better Off Dead-)
 PC Sally Armstrong (Cop Killer, Part One-)
 PC Billy Rowan (Cop Killer, Part One)
 Sgt Callum Stone (Good Cop, Bad Cop-)
 PC Benjamin Gayle (Cracking Under Pressure-)
 PC Nate Roberts (Collateral Damage-)
 DS Max Carter (Assault on Sun Hill, Part One-)

Departures
 PC Honey Harman – shot dead by drugs baron Kristen Shaw 
 DC Zain Nadir – sent to prison for his part in PC Honey Harman's murder
 DAC Georgia Hobbs – exposed as part of a corruption scandal involving council officials
 Sgt June Ackland – retires and leaves with fiance Rod Jessop
 CPS Lawyer Matt Hinckley – dismissed after being charged with abusing his former lover and wife
 DOPA Mia Perry – changes station after the Love triangle involving her Supt John Heaton and DC Mickey Webb
 PC Billy Rowan – murdered during his first day on duty
 PC Lewis Hardy – transfers to Operation Trident
 PC Dan Casper – leaves the force to take a security job in Ibiza
 PC Leela Kapoor – transfers to the Foreign and Commonwealth office
 DS Phil Hunter – transfers to Specialist Crimes at New Scotland Yard

Episodes

2007 British television seasons
The Bill series